The 35th Regiment Illinois Volunteer Infantry was an infantry regiment that served in the Union Army during the American Civil War.

Service
The 35th Illinois Infantry was organized at Decatur, Illinois and mustered into Federal service on July 3, 1861, for three years service. Its organizer and first colonel was Gustavus A. Smith after whom it was originally called G.A. Smith's Independent Regiment.

The regiment was mustered out on September 27, 1864, at Springfield, Illinois.

Total strength and casualties
The regiment suffered 7 officers and 91 enlisted men who were killed in action or who died of their wounds and 5 officers and 164 enlisted men who died of disease, for a total of 267 fatalities.

Commanders
Colonel Gustavus A. Smith - promoted to brigadier general on September 19, 1862.
Colonel William P. Chandler - Mustered out with the regiment.

See also
List of Illinois Civil War Units
Illinois in the American Civil War

Notes

References
The Civil War Archive

Units and formations of the Union Army from Illinois
1861 establishments in Illinois
Military units and formations established in 1861
Military units and formations disestablished in 1864